2 was a designation given to several transit lines in Los Angeles, California. The number was assigned to a streetcar route in 1930 which lasted a year, then later reassigned to a new service in 1932. Trolley buses replaced streetcars in 1941, and the line was converted to full motor coach operation in 1963.

West 7th Line

The first incarnation of the 2 was assembled from existing trackage, running from 7th Street and Central to and Vermont Avenue and 1st Street. It ran during peak periods only and lasted from 1930 to June 1931.

Second version

The new 2 line has a more continuous history. It began service on June 12, 1932, as a combination of two former routes: A-2 West Adams and Griffith Avenue Line and C Crown Hill and Temple Street Line. It ran from Montecito and Griffin in the east to Belmont and Temple where connections were available to the L car. Pacific Electric's construction of the Hill Street Tunnel in 1939 forced the line to be diverted to Temple Street and Hill Street; the former route was never reinstated. 
that same year, the Griffin Avenue section was converted to bus service and the line was routed to 5th Street, which was already in service under the D, U, and V lines. The line ceased service on October 5, 1941, with the closure of the Crown Hill branch, and was thereupon converted to trolley bus service.

Trolley coach and bus operation
The service was maintained and transferred to Los Angeles Metropolitan Transit Authority in 1958. The agency replaced trolley buses with SilverLiner coaches after March 31, 1963; the new service retained the number 2.

Sources

External links
 2 Line Archives — Pacific Electric Railway Historical Society
 

Los Angeles Railway routes
Railway services introduced in 1930
Railway services introduced in 1932
1930 establishments in California
1941 disestablishments in California